"Greenlight" is a song by American rapper Pitbull featuring fellow American rappers Flo Rida and LunchMoney Lewis. It was released for digital download on July 22, 2016 as the second single of Pitbull's tenth studio album Climate Change, through RCA Records, Polo Grounds Music, and Mr. 305 Inc. The song was written by the artists alongside producers Dr. Luke and Cirkut.

Music video
On August 19, 2016, Pitbull uploaded the music video for "Greenlight" via YouTube. The video was filmed in Miami.

The Bugatti Veyron Limousine with gull wing door featured in the "Greenlight" music video, a retrofitted Lincoln with a Ford 4.6L V8 engine, was placed on auction in January 2023 via Mecum Auctions in Kissimmee, FL. The vehicle sold for $72,000 with a 10% buyer's premium, bringing the final selling price to $79,200.

Other media
The song was chosen as a theme song for WWE's WrestleMania 33.

Following the release of the song, RCA Records and Sony Music released a one-track promotional CD for "Greenlight".

The song can be heard in the season 2 (episode 12) of the TV series Lucifer during a party.

Charts

Certifications

References

External links
 

 

2016 songs
2016 singles
Pitbull (rapper) songs
Flo Rida songs
LunchMoney Lewis songs
Songs written by Pitbull (rapper)
Songs written by Flo Rida
Songs written by Dr. Luke
Songs written by LunchMoney Lewis
Song recordings produced by Dr. Luke
RCA Records singles